Nina Kennedy (born 5 April 1997) is an Australian athlete who holds the national record in the pole vault. She competed in the 2020 Tokyo Olympics and won gold in the 2022 Commonwealth Games.

Early years 
Kennedy was born in Busselton, three hours south of Perth. Her family moved to Perth and she completed primary school there. When she was 11 years old she joined her first club, Perry Lakes Little Athletics. Kennedy started pole vaulting one year later after a pole vault coach identified her talent at an athletics meet. In 2012, aged 14, Kennedy placed second in the senior Australian pole vault championships with a personal best of 4.10m. A year later she set a best of 4.31m and placed fifth at the IAAF World Youth (U18) Championships. At the 2014 IAAF World Juniors, she vaulted a personal best of 4.40m, just missing a medal to finish fourth.

Senior career 
In February 2015 in Perth, Kennedy cleared 4.43m, then 4.50m and finally 4.59m – a world junior record. This qualified her for the 2015 World Championships in Beijing but she failed to clear the opening height in the qualification round.

In 2018, Kennedy raised her personal best to 4.60m and a week later moved to number three Australian all-time with a vault of 4.71m. At the National Championships she vaulted a 4.60m and defeated New Zealand's Olympic bronze medallist Eliza McCartney.

At the 2018 Gold Coast Commonwealth Games Kennedy won bronze. In early 2020, Kennedy cleared her second-best ever height of 4.61m and was consistent with eight consecutive competitions at 4.70m or higher.

At the 2020 Tokyo Olympics Kennedy jumped while injured, with a 4.40m clearance that placed 12th in her qualifier.

Kennedy raised the Australian record to 4.82m at the 2021 Sydney Track Classic.

At the 2022 World Athletics Championships, Kennedy won bronze with a clearance of 4.80m. This clearance saw Kennedy achieve the highest jump by an Australian at a World Athletics Championships, surpassing Alana Boyd’s mark of 4.60m achieved at the 2015 World Athletics Championships held in Beijing. The next month, at the 2022 Commonwealth Games, Kennedy won gold with a clearance of 4.60m.

Competition record

References

External links

 
 Nina Kennedy at Athletics Australia
 Nina Kennedy at Australian Athletics Historical Results

1997 births
Living people
Australian female pole vaulters
World Athletics Championships athletes for Australia
Athletes from Perth, Western Australia
Commonwealth Games medallists in athletics
Commonwealth Games bronze medallists for Australia
Athletes (track and field) at the 2018 Commonwealth Games
Athletes (track and field) at the 2020 Summer Olympics
Olympic athletes of Australia
20th-century Australian women
21st-century Australian women
Medallists at the 2018 Commonwealth Games